Monchique is a municipality of southern Portugal, in Faro District (province of Algarve). The population in 2011 was 6,045, in an area of 395.30 km2.

The Municipality of Monchique is situated in the Serra de Monchique and together with the town of Monchique is a tourist destination. Attractions include a historic town centre, views from the two peaks of Foia and Picota, hiking, bird watching and biking. Eucalyptus, cork oak, oranges, lemons, honey, olive oil, chestnuts, scissor chairs made from chestnut wood, black pork and black pork ham and sausages are the chief products. There are several small industries producing tourist artifacts that are sold in local shops, and medronho, a local brew made from distilled medronho berries (Arbutus/Strawberry Tree), is produced.

Parishes
Administratively, the municipality is divided into 3 civil parishes (freguesias):
 Alferce
 Marmelete
 Monchique

Climate
Monchique has a Mediterranean climate with warm to hot summers and mild, wet winters. Due to its altitude and location, right between the valley formed by the Serra de Monchique, precipitation in the winter is much larger than anywhere else on the Algarve. Its position on the southwest corner of Portugal gives it very mild temperatures in the winter, especially for its altitude.

References

External links

official Monchique Municipality website
Monchiqueportugal.info

Populated places in Faro District
Municipalities of the Algarve
Towns of the Algarve
Municipalities of Faro District